Sebrus absconditus is a moth in the family Crambidae. It was described by Graziano Bassi in 1995. It is found in South Africa and Zimbabwe.

References

Crambinae
Moths described in 1995